A referendum on amending the electoral system for the Legislature was held in the United States Virgin Islands on March 30, 2019. Although the proposal was approved by 75% of voters, voter turnout was below 10%, invaliding the result.

Background
The referendum was a popular initiative put forward by the St. Croix Government Retirees organization. In order for the initiative to go to a referendum, the organization was required to collect the signatures of at least 10% of registered voters in the two electoral districts, St Croix and St Thomas/St John. They collected 2,343 signatures in St Croix (above the 2,298 required) and 2,553 in St Thomas/St John (where 2,530 were required), meaning that the proposal would be put to a public vote.

In order for the referendum result to be valid, a majority would need to vote in favor of the proposal and voter turnout be above 50%.

Proposals
Prior to the referendum, the 15 members of the Legislature consisted of fourteen members elected from two seven-member districts (St Croix and St Thomas/St John) and one at-large member (who had to be a St John resident). The proposals would see both St Croix and St Thomas divided into two two-member districts, while St John would be a single-member district. Three at-large members would also be elected from both St Croix and St Thomas.

Results

References

Referendums in the United States Virgin Islands
2019 in the United States Virgin Islands
United States Virgin Islands